Coucy is the name or part of the name of several communes in France:

 Coucy-la-Ville, in the Aisne département, very close to 
 Coucy-le-Château-Auffrique, in the Aisne département, location of:
 Château de Coucy
 Lord of Coucy, a medieval lordship linked to the Château (see below)
 Coucy, Ardennes, in the Ardennes département
 Coucy-lès-Eppes in the Aisne département

People

Marie de Coucy (c.1218–1285), Queen-consort of Scotland, wife to Alexander II of Scotland, daughter to Enguerrand III below.
Robert De Coucy or Courcy, architect of Reims Cathedral, and his father of the same name.

Lords of Coucy:
Enguerrand I, Lord of Coucy (1080–1116)
Thomas, Lord of Coucy (1116–1130) and Count of Amiens.
Enguerrand II, Lord of Coucy (1130–1149)
Ralph I, Lord of Coucy (1149–1191)
Enguerrand III, Lord of Coucy (1191–1246)
Raoul II, Lord of Coucy (1246–1250)
Enguerrand IV, Lord of Coucy (1250–1311) brother of Raoul II
Enguerrand V, Lord of Coucy (1311–1321), son of Arnold III of Guînes and Alix Coucy. Grandson of Enguerrand III, Lord of Coucy
William, Lord of Coucy (1321–1335)
Enguerrand VI, Lord of Coucy (1335–1346)
Enguerrand VII, Lord of Coucy (1346–1397)